The Trumpchi GS5 is a compact crossover produced by GAC Group under the Trumpchi brand. The first generation was sold from 2011 to 2017 with a facelift variant called the GS5 Super launched in 2014, while the second generation model was sold starting in 2018. A facelift for the 2021 model year was launched during the 2021 Shanghai Auto Show, changing the name to Trumpchi GS4 Plus.



First generation (2011)

The first generation Trumpchi GS5 debuted during the 2011 Guangzhou Auto Show. Sales started in April 2012. Original prices ranges from 123,800 yuan to 229,800 yuan.

Powertrain
A 1.8-litre turbo engine and a 2.4-litre engine was available at a later date.

Specifications
The Trumpchi GS5 is based on the same platform as the Trumpchi GA5 sedan which is based on the old Alfa Romeo 166, with a few selected engines also supplied by FCA.

Trumpchi GS5 Super
A facelift was conducted in 2014, changing the name to Trumpchi GS5S or Trumpchi GS5 Super, and adding a 7-speed DCT. Price of the Trumpchi GS5 Super starts around 123,800 yuan and ends at around 156,800 yuan.

Recall 
One million GS5s and other Trumpchi cars were recalled in 2018 because of fuel pump safety issues.

Second generation (2018)

The second generation Trumpchi GS5 was unveiled during the 2018 Paris Auto Show with prices ranging from 120,000 to 175,000 yuan.

The second generation GS5 is equipped with the "Trumpchi Cloud Concept 2.0" infotainment system with embedded navigation.

Powertrain
Powering the second generation GS5 is s a 1.5-liter turbocharged I4 engine producing a maximum  at 5000 rpm
Gearbox is a six-speed automatic transmission.

Dodge Journey 

The Trumpchi GS5 is sold in the Mexican market as the Dodge Journey. It was revealed on 27 September 2021 and  arrived in Mexican Dodge showrooms in November. It is sold in three trim levels: SXT, Sport, and GT.

The Journey is manufactured in China by GAC Fiat Chrysler.

Trumpchi GS4 Plus (2021)

A facelift of the second generation GS5 for the 2021 model year was launched during the 2021 Shanghai Auto Show, changing the name to Trumpchi GS4 Plus. The Trumpchi GS4 Plus features completely redesigned front and rear ends and restyled 19-inch alloys, while the interior still heavily resembles the interior of the second generation GS5.

The infotainment system of the GS4 Plus is CarLife by Baidu, with CarPlay and voice command as optional features for higher trim models.

Powertrain
The Trumpchi GS4 Plus is powered by a 2.0-litre turbo engine codenamed 4B20J1 developing a maximum  and  mated to a 6-speed automatic transmission.

Sales

See also
 List of GAC vehicles

References

External links

 
 (GS5 Super) 
 (Global)

Crossover sport utility vehicles
Compact sport utility vehicles
Front-wheel-drive vehicles
2010s cars
Cars introduced in 2012
Cars of China
GS5